Phyllip Wayne Stephenson (born February 5, 1945) is an American accountant and politician. He has represented the 85th District in the Texas House of Representatives since 2013. A member of the Republican Party, Stephenson also serves as an accountant at his own firm since 1976.

Education and career
Stephenson earned a Bachelor of Business Administration degree at Texas Tech University in 1969, before moving to Wharton, Texas in 1974. Since then he opened up his own accounting firm in Wharton, Stephenson, LeGrand & Pfeil, PLLC.

Personal life 
Phil and his first wife, Barbara, have two children. They married on October 6, 1973, and a year later they both moved to their new hometown of Wharton. Barbara died on September 25, 2016.

References

External links
 Campaign website
 State legislative page

1945 births
Living people
Republican Party members of the Texas House of Representatives
21st-century American politicians
Texas Tech University alumni
People from Wharton, Texas
People from Duncan, Oklahoma
American accountants